Peter Jacobus van Vossen (born 21 April 1968) is a Dutch former professional football player and manager.

Club career
Van Vossen was born in Zierikzee. As a footballer, he played for Beveren, Anderlecht, Ajax, Istanbulspor, Rangers, Feyenoord, De Graafschap and Vitesse. During his time with Ajax he won the 1994–95 European Cup.

He joined Rangers in January 1996 in an exchange deal for Russian striker Oleg Salenko from Turkish side Istanbulspor, but made just seven Scottish Premier Division appearances that season, failing to score. He managed five goals in 14 appearances the following season as Rangers matched Celtic's record of nine successive league title, but featured just once in the 1997–98 campaign before returning to the Netherlands and signing for Feyenoord.

International career
Van Vossen picked up 31 international caps for the Netherlands national team, scoring nine goals. He participated at 1994 FIFA World Cup and at the Euro 2000. Van Vossen was initially selected to participate at Euro 1992, but missed it due to thrombosis.

Career statistics
Scores and results list the Netherlands' goal tally first, score column indicates score after each van Vossen goal.

Honours
Ajax
 UEFA Champions League: 1994–95

Rangers
 Scottish Premier Division: 1996–97
 Scottish League Cup: 1996–97

Feyenoord
 Eredivisie: 1998–99
 Johan Cruyff Shield: 1999

References

External links

1968 births
Living people
Footballers from Zierikzee
Association football forwards
1994 FIFA World Cup players
AFC Ajax players
Belgian Pro League players
De Graafschap players
Dutch expatriate footballers
Dutch footballers
Eredivisie players
Expatriate footballers in Belgium
Expatriate footballers in Scotland
Expatriate footballers in Turkey
VC Vlissingen players
K.S.K. Beveren players
R.S.C. Anderlecht players
Feyenoord players
İstanbulspor footballers
Netherlands international footballers
Rangers F.C. players
SBV Vitesse players
Scottish Football League players
Süper Lig players
UEFA Euro 2000 players
Fortuna Sittard managers
Almere City FC managers
UEFA Champions League winning players
Dutch football managers